Hugues Duboscq (born 29 August 1981 in Saint-Lô, Manche, France) is an Olympic breaststroke swimmer from France. He swam for France at the 2000, 2004, 2008 Olympics and 2012 Olympics. He has won three Olympic bronze medals.

At the 2009 World Championships, he set the European Record in the men's 100 breaststroke (58.64).

See also
 Hugues Duboscq on French Wikipedia

References

1981 births
Living people
People from Saint-Lô
Olympic bronze medalists for France
French male breaststroke swimmers
Olympic swimmers of France
Swimmers at the 2000 Summer Olympics
Swimmers at the 2004 Summer Olympics
Swimmers at the 2008 Summer Olympics
Swimmers at the 2012 Summer Olympics
Olympic bronze medalists in swimming
World Aquatics Championships medalists in swimming
European Aquatics Championships medalists in swimming
Medalists at the 2008 Summer Olympics
Officers of the Ordre national du Mérite
Medalists at the 2004 Summer Olympics
Mediterranean Games gold medalists for France
Swimmers at the 2005 Mediterranean Games
Sportspeople from Manche
Mediterranean Games medalists in swimming
20th-century French people
21st-century French people